Indiana has the twenty-seventh highest per capita income in the United States of America, at $20,397 (2000).  Its personal per capita income is $28,783 (2003).

Indiana counties ranked by per capita income

Note: Table data is from the 2010 United States Census Data and the 2006-2010 American Community Survey 5-Year Estimates.

References

United States locations by per capita income
Locations by per capita income
Indiana geography-related lists